Saiko is a Chilean synth-pop and pop rock band established in the late 1990s. Throughout their career they have achieved great notoriety in the musical Chilean scene, largely due to the charisma, image and voice of their vocalist, Denisse Malebrán, and the musical talent and experience of Rodrigo "Coti" Aboitiz and Luciano Rojas, both former members and founders of the Chilean group La Ley. To date they have released seven studio albums: Informe Saiko (1999), Campos finitos (2001), Todo Saiko (2003), Las horas (2004), Volar (2007), Trapecio (2013) and Lengua Muerta (2017).

History 
In 1998, musician Luciano Rojas left the band La Ley and met Rodrigo Aboitiz, another former member of the band in Mexico City with the intention of creating a new musical project. Both musicians returned to Santiago, Chile where they joined with Iván Delgado other musician who was part of the band La Ley in its beginnings, perform a casting to hire a female singer to form a new band, the selected is the singer Denisse Malebrán, who had studies of singing, and formed Part of the emerging bands Turbomente and Polaroid.

Discography
Studio albums:
1999: Informe Saiko
2001: Campos Finitos
2004: Las Horas
2007: Volar
2013: Trapecio
2017: Lengua Muerta
Live albums:
2006: Saiko Blondie 2005
2017: Sigo Quemando Infinitos
Compilation albums:
2003: Todo Saiko

Members 

Current members
 Denisse Malebrán – frontwoman (1999–2007, 2012–present)
 Luciano Rojas – bass, guitar (1999–present)
 Mauricio Claveria - drums, percussion (2019–present)

Former members
 Iván Delgado – keyboards (1999–2002)
 Javier Torres – drums, percussion (2004–2011)
 Esteban Torres – bass (2004–2011)
 Jorge Martínez – bass (2004–2005)
 Marcela Castro Thais – frontwoman (2007–2012)
 Paulo Ahumada – guitar (2012–2016)
 Rodrigo Aboitiz – synthesizer (1999–2003, 2012–2016)
 Roberto Bosch – drums, percussion (2012–2019)
 Carlos Azócar – guitar (2016–2019)

Chronology

References

External links

Rock en Español music groups
Chilean rock music groups
Musical groups established in 1998